Line M1 is the first line of the Warsaw Metro. It is 23.1 km long, has 21 stations and runs from the Kabaty estate in the Ursynów district to the Młociny district in Bielany.

The decision to build it was made in 1982, and a year later the first works in Ursynów began. In 1995, the first section of the route connecting Ursynów and Mokotów with Śródmieście was launched, and the next sections were put into operation in the following years. In 2008, construction of the Bielany section was completed and crossings on the whole line were started. In 2014, a decision was taken to abandon the plans to build two downtown stations, which were omitted in 1989 for financial reasons.

M1 trains run from approximately 5:00 AM to 12:10 AM (from Monday to Thursday and Sunday) and from approximately 5:00 AM to 3:00 AM (Fridays and Saturdays).

Current stations

Future stations

Rolling stock

Depots 
A single depot is located south of the Kabaty station.

External links

 
 Warsaw at UrbanRail.net
 Warsaw Metro Map
 Warsaw Metro fan site and discussion forum 
 pictures of Warsaw Metro 
 Stations as Canvas: Painting the Warsaw Metro

Warsaw Metro lines
Railway lines opened in 1995
1995 establishments in Poland